Walter Robert Amos (1899–1967) was a footballer who played in the Football League for Bury. He is Bury's third-highest goalscorer in the Football League with 122.

References

1899 births
1967 deaths
Footballers from Grimsby
Association football outside forwards
English footballers
Worksop Town F.C. players
Bury F.C. players
Accrington Stanley F.C. (1891) players
English Football League players
English Football League representative players